The 2019 United States attorney general elections were held primarily on November 5, 2019, in 3 states. The previous attorney general elections for this group of states took place in 2015. One state attorney general ran for reelection and won, while Democrat Jim Hood of Mississippi and Andy Beshear of Kentucky did not run for re-election to run for governor.

The elections took place concurrently with the 2019 House of Representatives elections, the 2019 gubernatorial elections, and numerous state and local elections.

Republicans won every seat in this election, with a net gain of two.

Election predictions 
Several sites and individuals published predictions of competitive seats. These predictions looked at factors such as the strength of the incumbent (if the incumbent is running for re-election), the strength of the candidates, and the partisan leanings of the state (reflected in part by the state's Cook Partisan Voting Index rating). The predictions assigned ratings to each seat, with the rating indicating the predicted advantage that a party has in winning that seat.

Most election predictors use:

 "tossup": no advantage
 "tilt" (used by some predictors): advantage that is not quite as strong as "lean"
 "lean": slight advantage
 "likely": significant, but surmountable, advantage
 "safe": near-certain chance of victory

Statistics

Race summary

Partisan control of statewide offices

Kentucky 

The 2019 Kentucky Attorney General election was conducted on November 5. Primary elections occurred on May 21, 2019. The general election was held on November 5, 2019. Incumbent Democratic Attorney General Andy Beshear declined to seek reelection to a second term to successfully run for Governor. Republican Daniel Cameron won with 57.8% of the vote. He became the first Republican elected attorney general of Kentucky since Eldon S. Dummit in 1944, and the state's first black attorney general.

Republican primary

Democratic primary 
Greg Stumbo, former Attorney General of Kentucky and former Speaker of the Kentucky House of Representatives, won the Democratic nomination unopposed, so no primary was held.

General election

Louisiana 

The 2019 Louisiana Attorney General election took place on October 12, 2019 to elect the Attorney General of the state of Louisiana, with a runoff election, held on November 16, 2019. Incumbent  Republican Attorney General Jeff Landry ran for a second term against Democrat Ike Jackson. Landy and Jackson were the only candidates to declare. 

Under Louisiana's jungle primary system, all candidates appeared on the same ballot, regardless of party, and voters could vote for any candidate, regardless of their party affiliation.

General election

Mississippi 

The 2019 Mississippi Attorney General election was held on November 5, 2019, to elect the Attorney General of Mississippi. Incumbent Jim Hood declined to seek re-election to a fifth term, instead running unsuccessfully for Governor. State Treasurer Lynn Fitch won the Republican nomination in a primary runoff against Andy Taggart, and she defeated Democratic nominee Jennifer Riley Collins in the general election. Fitch became the first Republican to hold the office since 1878, as well as the first woman to ever be elected to the position in state history. It also marked the first time in over a century where no members of the Democratic Party held statewide office.

Republican primary

Runoff

Democratic primary

General election

Notes

References